Eliya III Abu Halim was Patriarch of the Church of the East from 1176 to 1190.

Biography 
Eliya established the Metropolitan of Kashkar. Brief accounts of Eliya's patriarchate are given in the Ecclesiastical Chronicle of the Jacobite writer Bar Hebraeus and in the ecclesiastical histories of the fourteenth-century Nestorian writers Amr and Sliba.

The following account of Eliya's patriarchate is given by Bar Hebraeus:

In the year 572 of the Arabs [AD 1175/6], on the Sunday of 'Come, let us adore him', namely the third Sunday after Epiphany, Eliya Abu Halim was consecrated catholicus of the Nestorians.  This man composed Arabic homilies for Sunday feasts in admirable and polished language.  He was a man of perfect stature, in the prime of life, modest and liberal, rich in ecclesiastical knowledge, and extremely well versed in the language of the Saracens, as is testified by his commentary in which he beautifully describes both the Jacobite and Nestorian feasts celebrated in the East.  He was born in the city of Maiperqat, and was first consecrated a bishop, then metropolitan of Nisibis, and finally catholicus.  He restored the ruins of the patriarchal cell and made them habitable again.  After fulfilling his office for fifteen years he died on the night of the sixth feria, on the third day of nisan [April], in the year 586 of the Arabs [AD 1190], and was buried in Baghdad in the church of the third ward.

See also
 List of patriarchs of the Church of the East

References

Sources
 Abbeloos, J. B., and Lamy, T. J., Bar Hebraeus, Chronicon Ecclesiasticum (3 vols, Paris, 1877)
 
 
 Brooks, E. W., Eliae Metropolitae Nisibeni Opus Chronologicum (Rome, 1910)
 Gismondi, H., Maris, Amri, et Salibae: De Patriarchis Nestorianorum Commentaria I: Amri et Salibae Textus (Rome, 1896)
 Gismondi, H., Maris, Amri, et Salibae: De Patriarchis Nestorianorum Commentaria II: Maris textus arabicus et versio Latina (Rome, 1899)
 Seleznyov, Nikolai N., Katolikos-Patriarh Tserkvi Vostoka Mar Iliya III i ego "Slovo na prazdnik Rozhdestva Hristova, in: Simvol 55 (Paris-Moscow, 2009): 389–395.
 

Patriarchs of the Church of the East
12th-century bishops of the Church of the East
Nestorians in the Abbasid Caliphate
1190 deaths